The Jersey Chamber Orchestra is a semi-professional orchestra based in the island of Jersey. The orchestra's music director is the Israeli conductor and violinist Daniel Cohen.

History

The orchestra was founded in 2007 as part of the charity Music in Action. The aims of Music in Action are to promote and support the development of music in Jersey by organising popular cultural events of high quality, while promoting and supporting other Jersey charities. Every year they provide opportunities for local children to be educated and inspired by the visiting professional musicians. The orchestra performs as part of the annual Liberation Festival.

Soloists

The orchestra has played with soloists of international renown, including:
 Elizabeth Watts (soprano)
 Nicola Benedetti (violin)
 Natalie Clein (cello)
 Graeme Danby (bass)

References

External links 
 YouTube - JCO at Jersey Liberation Festival 2010 
 Music in Action Jersey 
 Jersey Liberation International Music Festival Website (with details of previous JCO concerts 

Chamber orchestras
Jersey culture